One Just Man may refer to: 
 "One Just Man" (The Vise), 1954 The Vise television episode
 One Just Man, 1975 film a.k.a. Syndicate Sadists 
 The putative only just man in the city of Sodom, namely Lot (Sodom)
 One Just Man, the 1974 novel by James Mills.